Gaultheria insipida, called chichaja in Spanish, is a flowering shrub of the plant genus Gaultheria. The species is native to the Andes; specimens have been found in Colombia, Ecuador, and Peru.

In autumn, the leaves turn a burgundy colour, and the shrub's pink flowers mature into small, white berries topped with five red spots.

Two varieties have been described: G. insipida insipida and G. insipida peruviana. James Francis Macbride found the latter in the Huánuco Region of central Peru, and published his description in 1959.

Inga traditional medicine
In the Putumayo department of southwestern Colombia, the Inga people treat chronic pain and other conditions with a drink by simmering the root of the plant in water for several hours.

For myalgia (body ache), low energy/motivation, and hypersomnia, the patient drinks an infusion of chichaja. The infusion is also said to cleanse the blood and to help prevent disease. In cases of rheumatism, chronic fatigue, or hemorrhoids, the patient drinks the infusion hot.

In Colombia,  is sometimes called yagé hembra ("female ayahuasca"), whereas in Peru this nickname describes Diplopterys cabrerana.

References

Further reading

External links
 Gaultheria insipida at Botanicus.org

Flora of Colombia
Flora of Ecuador
insipida
Medicinal plants of South America